Palacio del Deán Ortega is a palace in Úbeda, in the Province of Jaén, Spain. It was founded in the 16th century and was constructed by Fernando Ortega Salido. In 2003 it was declared a Bien de Interés Cultural site.

References

Paradores
Palaces in Andalusia
Bien de Interés Cultural landmarks in the Province of Jaén (Spain)
Renaissance architecture in Andalusia